Aldrich Hazen "Rick" Ames (born May 26, 1941) is a former Central Intelligence Agency (CIA) officer turned KGB double agent, who was convicted of espionage in 1994. He is serving a life sentence, without the possibility of parole, in the Federal Correctional Institution in Terre Haute, Indiana. Ames was a 31-year CIA counterintelligence officer who committed espionage against the U.S. by spying for the Soviet Union and Russia. Ames was known to have compromised more highly classified CIA assets than any other officer until Robert Hanssen, who was arrested seven years later in 2001.

Early life and work 

Aldrich Ames was born in River Falls, Wisconsin, to Carleton Cecil Ames and Rachel Ames (née Aldrich). His father was a college lecturer at the Wisconsin State College-River Falls, and his mother a high school English teacher. Aldrich was the eldest of three children and the only son. In 1952, his father began working for the CIA's Directorate of Operations in Virginia, and in 1953 was posted to Southeast Asia for three years, accompanied by his family. Carleton received a "particularly negative performance appraisal", in part because of serious alcoholism, and spent the remainder of his career at CIA headquarters.

Ames attended high school at McLean High School in McLean, Virginia. Beginning in 1957, following his sophomore year, he worked for the CIA for three summers as a low-ranking (GS-3) records analyst, marking classified documents for filing. In 1959, Ames entered the University of Chicago planning to study foreign cultures and history, but his "long-time passion" for drama resulted in failing grades and he did not finish his sophomore year. Ames worked at the CIA during the summer of 1960 as a laborer/painter. He then became an assistant technical director at a Chicago theater until February 1962. Returning to the Washington area, Ames took full-time employment at the CIA doing the same sort of clerical jobs he had performed in high school.

CIA career 
Five years after first working for the CIA, Ames completed a bachelor's degree in history at the George Washington University. He did not plan to have a career with the CIA, but after attaining the grade of GS-7 and receiving good performance appraisals, he was accepted into the Career Trainee Program despite several alcohol-related brushes with the police. In 1969, Ames married a fellow CIA officer, Nancy Segebarth, whom he had met in the Career Trainee Program.

When Ames was assigned to Ankara, Nancy resigned from the CIA because of a rule that prohibited married partners from working from the same office. Ames' job in Turkey was to target Soviet intelligence officers for recruitment. He succeeded in infiltrating the communist Dev-Genç organization through a roommate of student activist Deniz Gezmiş. In spite of this success, Ames' performance was rated only "satisfactory". Discouraged by the critical assessment, Ames considered leaving the CIA.

In 1972, Ames returned to CIA headquarters and spent the next four years in the Soviet-East European (SE) Division. His performance reviews were "generally enthusiastic", apparently because he was better at managing paperwork and planning field operations than recruiting agents. Nevertheless, his excessive drinking was also noted, and two "eyes only" memoranda were placed in his file.

In 1976, Ames was assigned to New York City, where he handled two important Soviet assets. His performance was rated excellent, and he received several promotions and bonuses, being ranked above most operations officers in his pay grade. However, Ames' tendency to procrastinate in submissions of financial accounting was noted. His inattention to detail also led him to commit two important security violations, including once leaving a briefcase containing classified operational materials on the subway. Ames apparently received only a verbal reprimand.

In 1981, Ames accepted a posting to Mexico City while his wife remained in New York. His evaluations in Mexico were mediocre at best, and he engaged in at least three extramarital affairs. He married Rosario in 1985, with whom he fathered a son, Paul Ames, who was born in 1989. Despite CIA regulations, Ames did not report his romance with a foreign national to his superiors, even though some of his colleagues were aware of it. His lackluster performance reviews were in part the result of heavy drinking. At a diplomatic reception in Mexico City, Ames got into a loud, drunken argument with a Cuban official that "caused alarm" among his superiors.

Nevertheless, in September 1983, the CIA assigned Ames back to the SE division in Washington. His reassignment placed him "in the most sensitive element" of the Department of Operations, which was responsible for Soviet counterintelligence. Ames had access to all CIA plans and operations against the KGB and the GRU, Soviet military intelligence. In October, he formally separated from Nancy; in November, he submitted an "outside activity" report to the CIA, noting his romantic relationship with Rosario. As part of his divorce settlement, Ames agreed to pay the  debts that he and his wife had accrued, as well as provide Nancy monthly support for three and a half years, a total of about $46,000. Ames thought the divorce might bankrupt him, and later said that this financial pressure was what had first led him to consider spying for the Soviet Union. Rosario had also proven to be a heavy spender, phoning her family in Colombia at a cost of $400 a month, and going on shopping sprees as well.
After her arrest, the FBI discovered sixty purses in the Ames' house, more than five hundred pairs of shoes, and 165 unopened boxes of pantyhose.

Espionage 

Ames routinely assisted another CIA office that assessed Soviet embassy officials as potential intelligence assets. As part of this responsibility, and with the knowledge of both the CIA and the FBI, Ames began making contacts within the Soviet embassy. In April 1985, Ames provided information to the Soviets that he believed was "essentially valueless" but would establish his credentials as a CIA insider. He also asked for $50,000, which the Soviets quickly paid. Ames later claimed that he had not prepared for more than the initial "con game" to satisfy his immediate indebtedness, but having "crossed a line" he "could never step back".

Ames soon identified more than ten top-level CIA and FBI sources who were reporting on Soviet activities. Not only did Ames believe that there was "as much money as [he] could ever use" in betraying these intelligence assets, but their elimination would also reduce the chance of his own espionage being discovered. The CIA's network of Soviet-bloc agents began disappearing at an alarming rate, such as agent Gennady Varenik and agent Dmitri Polyakov. The CIA realized something was wrong but was reluctant to consider the possibility of a mole within their agency. Initial investigations focused on possible breaches caused by Soviet bugs, or a code which had been broken.

The CIA initially blamed asset losses on another former CIA agent, Edward Lee Howard, who had also been passing information to the Soviets. But when the CIA lost three other important assets about whom Howard could not have known anything, it was clear that the arrests (and resulting executions) were the result of information provided by another source. As one CIA officer put it, the Soviets "were wrapping up our cases with reckless abandon", which was highly unusual because the "prevailing wisdom among the Agency's professional 'spy catchers was that suddenly eliminating all the assets known to the mole would put him in danger. In fact, Ames' KGB handlers apologized to him, saying they disagreed with that course of action, but that the decision to immediately eliminate all American assets had been made at the highest political levels.

Meanwhile, Ames continued to meet openly with his contact at the Soviet embassy, Sergey Dmitriyevich Chuvakhin. For a time, Ames summarized for the CIA and FBI the progress of what he portrayed as an attempt to recruit the Soviet. Ames received $20,000 to $50,000 every time the two had lunch. Ultimately, Ames received $4.6 million from the Soviets, which allowed him to enjoy a lifestyle well beyond the means of a CIA officer. In August 1985, when Ames' divorce became final, he immediately married Rosario. Understanding that his new wealth would raise eyebrows, he developed a cover story that his prosperity was the result of money given to him by his Colombian wife's wealthy family. Ames wired considerable amounts of his espionage payments to his new in-laws in Bogotá to help improve their actual impoverished status.

In mid-May 1985, someone had apparently reported to the Soviets that Oleg Gordievsky, their chief of station in London, was sending secrets to MI6 (he had, in fact, been doing so for 11 years, under great secrecy). Gordievsky was recalled to Moscow on May 17 and was drugged and interrogated about his alleged communications with MI6. There was great suspicion that Ames had reported Gordievsky's activity to Soviet counterintelligence. A 1994 report by The Washington Post, however, stated that "After six weeks of questioning Ames ... the FBI and CIA remain baffled about whether Ames or someone else first warned the Soviets about Gordievsky". An FBI report later stated that Ames had not advised the Soviets about Gordievsky until June 13, 1985. By that time, the spy was under KGB surveillance, although he was not charged with treason as of July 19, 1985, when MI6 agents began to exfiltrate him to Britain.

In 1986, following the loss of several CIA assets, Ames told the KGB that he feared he would be a suspect. The KGB threw U.S. investigators off Ames' trail by constructing an elaborate diversion, in which a Soviet case officer told a CIA contact that the mole was stationed at Warrenton Training Center (WTC), a secret CIA communications facility in Virginia. Mole hunters investigated 90 employees at WTC for almost a year and came up with ten suspects, although the lead investigator noted that "there are so many problem personalities that no one stands out".

In 1986, Ames was posted to Rome. There, his performance once again ranged from mediocre to poor and included evidence of problematic drinking. Regardless, in 1990–1991, he was reassigned to the CIA's Counterintelligence Center Analysis Group, providing him with access to "extremely sensitive data", including information on American double agents.

Later, after he had defected, Oleg Gordievsky spoke highly of the information that Ames had provided to the KGB, stating that "the significance of Ames was huge" and that the Soviets were impressed with the "quality and quantity" of secrets that he had delivered.

CIA response 

In late 1986, the CIA assembled a team to investigate the source of the leaks. Led by Paul Redmond, and consisting of Jeanne Vertefeuille, Sandra Grimes, Diana Worthen, and Dan Payne, the team examined different possible causes, including the possibilities that the KGB had bugged the agency, or intercepted its communications, or had a mole in place. By 1990, the CIA was certain that there was a mole in the agency but could not find the source. Recruitment of new Soviet agents came to a virtual halt, as the agency feared it could not protect its current assets.

Prior to that, in November 1989, a fellow employee reported that Ames seemed to be enjoying a lifestyle well beyond the means of a CIA officer, and that his wife's family was less wealthy than he had claimed. Worthen, one of the members of the mole leak team, had known Rosario Ames prior to her marriage, and had met with her one day to discuss installing drapes in the Ames residence. Worthen had recently installed drapes in her own home, and knew they could be expensive. She asked which room to concentrate upon first, at which Rosario laughed and said, "Do not worry about the price, we are going to have the whole house done at once!" Worthen also knew that Rosario's parents had little money, but a CIA contact in Bogotá observed that her family was now well-off. Nevertheless, the CIA moved slowly. When the investigator assigned to look at Ames' finances began a two-month training course, no one immediately replaced him. Investigators were also diverted by a false story from a CIA officer abroad who claimed that the Soviets had penetrated the CIA with an employee born in the USSR.

In 1986 and 1991, Ames passed two polygraph examinations while spying for the Soviet Union. Ames was initially "terrified" at the prospect of taking the test, but he was advised by the KGB "to just relax". Ames' test demonstrated deceptive answers to some questions but the examiners passed him, perhaps, in the later opinion of the CIA, because the examiners were "overly friendly" and therefore did not induce the proper physiological response.

The CIA finally focused on Ames after co-workers noted his sharper personal appearance, including:
 Cosmetic dentistry: Ames' teeth, which were yellowed by heavy smoking, were capped.
 Attire: previously, Ames had been known for "bargain basement" attire, but suddenly changed to wearing tailor-made suits not even his superiors could afford.

The CIA also realized that, despite Ames' annual salary being $60,000, he could afford:
 A $540,000 house in Arlington, Virginia, paid for in cash
 A $50,000 Jaguar luxury car
 Home remodeling and redecoration costs of $99,000
 Monthly phone bills exceeding $6,000, mostly calls by Ames' wife to her family in Colombia
 Premium credit cards, on which the minimum monthly payment exceeded his monthly salary.

Arrest 
In March 1993, the CIA and FBI began an intensive investigation of Ames that included electronic surveillance, combing through his trash, and the installation of a monitor in his car to track his movements. From November 1993 until his arrest, Ames was kept under virtually constant physical surveillance. When, in early 1994, he was scheduled to attend a conference in Moscow, the FBI believed it could wait no longer, and he and his wife were arrested on February 21. At his arrest, Ames told the officers, "You're making a big mistake! You must have the wrong man!"

On February 22, 1994, Ames and his wife were formally charged by the Department of Justice with spying for the Soviet Union and Russia. Ames' betrayal resulted in the deaths of a number of CIA assets. He pleaded guilty on April 28 and received a sentence of life imprisonment. As part of a plea bargain by Ames, his wife received a five-year prison sentence for tax evasion and conspiracy to commit espionage.

In court, Ames admitted that he had compromised "virtually all Soviet agents of the CIA and other American and foreign services known to me", and had provided the USSR and Russia with a "huge quantity of information on United States foreign, defense and security policies". It is estimated that information Ames provided to the Soviets led to the compromise of at least a hundred American intelligence operations and to the execution of at least ten sources. Furthermore, Ames' betrayal of CIA methods allowed the KGB to use "controlled agents" to feed the U.S. both genuine intelligence and disinformation from 1986 to 1993. Some of this "feed material" was incorporated into CIA intelligence reports, several of which even reached three presidents.

Ames said he was not afraid of being caught by the FBI or CIA but was afraid of Soviet defectors, saying, "Virtually every American who has been jailed in connection with espionage has been fingered by a Soviet source". Additionally, when asked about the polygraph tests, Ames said, "There's no special magic. Confidence is what does it. Confidence and a friendly relationship with the examiner. Rapport, where you smile and you make him think that you like him. Making the examiner believe that the exam has no importance to you seals the deal."

Post-sentence 
Ames is Federal Bureau of Prisons prisoner #40087-083, serving his life sentence in the medium-security Federal Correctional Institution (FCI) in Terre Haute, Indiana.

The CIA was criticized for not focusing on Ames sooner, given the obvious increase in his standard of living. There was a "huge uproar" in Congress when CIA Director James Woolsey decided that no one in the agency would be dismissed or demoted. "Some have clamored for heads to roll in order that we could say that heads have rolled," Woolsey declared. "Sorry, that's not my way." Woolsey resigned under pressure.

Ames' attorney, Plato Cacheris, had threatened to litigate the legality of FBI searches and seizures in Ames' home and office without conventional search warrants, although Ames' guilty plea made the threat moot. Congress then passed a new law giving that specific power to the Foreign Intelligence Surveillance Court.

CIA sources compromised 
 Vitaly Yurchenko was a KGB officer in the Fifth Department of Directorate K, "the highest-ranking KGB officer ever to defect to the United States". In August 1985, he defected via Rome to the United States, only to return to the Soviet Union three months later. Ames was privy to all information that Yurchenko gave to the CIA and was able to transmit it to the KGB, which allowed easy cover-ups of lost information. Yurchenko returned to the Soviet Union in 1985 and was reassigned to a desk job within the FCD as a reward for helping to keep Ames' spying a secret.
 Major General Dmitri Polyakov was the highest-ranking figure in the GRU, giving information to the CIA from the early 1960s until his retirement in 1980. He was executed in 1988 after Ames exposed him. Polyakov was probably the most valuable asset compromised by Ames. One CIA official said of Polyakov: "He didn't do this for money. He insisted on staying in place to help us."
 Colonel Oleg Gordievsky was the head of the London rezidentura (station) and spied for the SIS (MI6). Ames handed over information about Gordievsky that positively identified him as a double agent, although Gordievsky managed to escape to the Finnish border, where he was extracted to the United Kingdom via Norway by the SIS before he could be detained in the Soviet Union.
 Adolf Tolkachev was an electrical engineer who was one of the chief designers at the Phazotron company, which produces military radars and avionics. Tolkachev passed information to the CIA between 1979 and 1985, compromising multiple radar and missile secrets, as well as turning over classified information on avionics. He was arrested in 1985 after being compromised by both Ames and Edward Lee Howard and was executed in 1986.
  was a Line X (Technical & Scientific Intelligence) officer at the Washington rezidentura. Martynov revealed the identities of 50 Soviet intelligence officers operating from the embassy and technical and scientific targets that the KGB had penetrated. Martynov's name was given to the KGB by Ames and Martynov was executed.
 Major Sergei Motorin was a Line PR (political intelligence) officer at the Washington rezidentura, whom the FBI tried to blackmail into spying for the Americans. He eventually cooperated for his own reasons. Motorin was one of two moles at the rezidentura betrayed by Ames and was executed in 1988.
 Colonel Leonid Poleshchuk was a Line KR (counterintelligence) agent in Nigeria, also betrayed by Ames. Poleshchuk's arrest was attributed to a chance encounter in which KGB agents had observed a CIA agent loading a dead drop. After some time, Poleshchuk was seen removing the contents. Poleshchuk was eventually tried and executed.
 Sergey Fedorenko was a nuclear weapons expert assigned to the Soviet delegation to the United Nations. In 1977, Ames was assigned to handle him, and Fedorenko betrayed information about the Soviet missile program to Ames. The two men became good friends, hugging when Fedorenko was about to return to Moscow. "We had become close friends", said Ames. "We trusted each other completely." Ames was initially hesitant to inform on Fedorenko, but soon after handing over the majority of the information, he decided to betray him to "do a good job" for the KGB. Back in the USSR, Fedorenko used political connections to get himself out of trouble. Years later, Fedorenko met his friend Ames for an emotional reunion over lunch and promised to move to the United States for good. Ames promised to help. Shortly after the lunch, Ames betrayed him to the KGB for a second time. Fedorenko escaped arrest, defected, and is currently living in Rhode Island.
 In a 2004 interview with Howard Phillips Hart, who was the CIA Station Chief of Bonn, West Germany in the late 1980s, it was revealed that in 1988, Ames also betrayed a Mikoyan Gurevich Design Bureau engineer who had been working with the CIA for 14 years and had provided complete technical, test, and research data on all of the Soviet Union's fighter jets. According to Hart, his information "allowed the US Government to prevent the skies from being blacked out by Soviet bombers, saved us billions of dollars ... since we knew precisely what they could do".

Aldrich Ames and Jonathan Pollard 
Rafi Eitan, the Israeli handler of Jonathan Pollard, alleged that Pollard was blamed for some of Ames' crimes. Pollard went on to serve 30 years in prison for passing classified information to Israel. Eitan stated that Pollard never exposed American agents in the Soviet Union or elsewhere, and that he believed Ames tried to blame Pollard to clear himself of suspicion. "I have no doubt that had Pollard been tried today, in light of what is known about Ames and other agents who were exposed, he would have received a much lighter sentence".

In popular culture 
 Ames' story is dramatized in the 1998 movie Aldrich Ames: Traitor Within, starring Timothy Hutton as Ames.
 The 2014 ABC miniseries The Assets is based on the book Circle of Treason: A CIA Account of Traitor Aldrich Ames and the Men He Betrayed by Sandra Grimes and Jeanne Vertefeuille, two of the investigators who uncovered Ames' espionage. Grimes is one of the central characters in the series.
 Ames was portrayed by American actor Joseph DiMartino in the television program Mysteries at the Museum (Season 2, Episode 6) which chronicled the Aldrich Ames story and the infamous mailbox used as a signal.
 Ames was also mentioned in the 2003 film The Recruit, which uses the examples of Ames, Nicholson and Howard, to examine the ways in which the CIA works to prevent external espionage, but is, and always will be, subject to internal espionage.
 Ames is featured in Ben Macintyre's book The Spy and the Traitor: The Greatest Espionage Story of the Cold War. Macintyre observes that Ames had no particular communist sympathies, but, having been promised some $4M, his only motivation was money ("to buy a bigger car").
 Ames is also a subject of thematic card in a Cold War related board game Twilight Struggle.
 Ames is used as a plot device in Frederick Forsyth's novel Icon, published in 1996 by Bantam Books.
 Attributed to Ames is the quote, "Lying is wrong, son, but if it serves a greater good, it's OK." in the title scene of the television program Condor (Season 2, Episode 2, "If It Serves a Greater Good").  However, Macintyre attributes this quote to Ames' father.
Ames is referenced as CIA mole Robert Aldrich in Call of Duty Black Ops Cold War.
Ames is referenced as a double agent in Season 8 Episode 11 of the show Homeland.

References

Further reading 
  (Archive)
 
 Doyle, David W. Inside Espionage: A Memoir of True Men and Traitors, 2000, .
 Earley, Pete Confessions of a Spy: The Real Story of Aldrich Ames, New York: G. P. Putnam's Sons, 1997. .
 Grimes, Sandra and Vertefeuille, Jeanne. Circle of Treason: A CIA Account of Traitor Aldrich Ames and the Men He Betrayed, Naval Institute Press, 2012, .
 Maas, Peter. Killer Spy: The Inside Story of the FBI's Pursuit and Capture of Aldrich Ames, America's Deadliest Spy, Warner, 1995, .
 
 Rohter, Larry. "In Colombia, Past Without Clues of Spy Charges." The New York Times. February 27, 1994. – About Ames's wife
 Famous Cases Aldrich Hazen Ames - FBI

External links 
 
 U.S. Department of Justice Office of the Inspector General, "A Review of the FBI's Performance in Uncovering the Espionage Activities of Aldrich Hazen Ames (April 1997) – Unclassified Executive Summary
 "Famous Cases: Aldrich Ames", Federal Bureau of Investigation – A short description of Ames's spying career

1941 births
Living people
Alcohol abuse
Admitted Soviet spies
Soviet spies
American prisoners sentenced to life imprisonment
American people convicted of spying for the Soviet Union
American people convicted of spying for Russia
American people convicted of tax crimes
CIA agents convicted of crimes
Counterintelligence
Double agents
Columbian College of Arts and Sciences alumni
Incarcerated spies
People from River Falls, Wisconsin
People of the KGB
People convicted under the Espionage Act of 1917
Prisoners sentenced to life imprisonment by the United States federal government
University of Chicago alumni
George Washington University alumni